Dark Horses is the second solo studio album by Australian singer-songwriter Tex Perkins. The album was released in July 2000 and peaked at number 24 on the ARIA Charts.

The album was re-released in 2001 with a bonus 6-track live disc recorded Live at the Wireless and Live at the Laundry in September 2000.

Track listing

Charts

Release history

References

2000 albums
Tex Perkins albums